Cailliella is a genus of flowering plants belonging to the family Melastomataceae.

Its native range is Guinea.

Species:

Cailliella praerupticola

References

Melastomataceae
Melastomataceae genera